The 2016 Copa Fila was a professional tennis tournament played on clay courts. It was the sixth edition of the tournament which was part of the 2016 ATP Challenger Tour. It took place in Buenos Aires, Argentina between 10 and 16 October 2016.

Singles main-draw entrants

Seeds

 1 Rankings are as of October 3, 2016.

Other entrants
The following players received wildcards into the singles main draw:
  Camilo Ugo Carabelli
  Mariano Kestelboim
  Facundo Mena

The following players received entry from the qualifying draw:
  Daniel Dutra da Silva
  Pedro Sakamoto
  Bruno Sant'Anna
  Marcelo Zormann

The following players entered as lucky losers:
  Gabriel Alejandro Hidalgo
  João Pedro Sorgi

Champions

Singles

  Renzo Olivo def.  Leonardo Mayer, 4–6, 7–6(7–3), 7–6(7–3).

Doubles

  Julio Peralta /  Horacio Zeballos def.  Sergio Galdós /  Fernando Romboli, 7–6(7–5), 7–6(7–1).

References

External links
Official Website

Copa Fila